Acúrsio Freire Alves Carrelo (16 March 1931, in Lourenço Marques – 9 January 2010), better known as Acúrsio, was a Portuguese footballer. He played as a goalkeeper. He also had a rink hockey player career as a goalkeeper. He played for FC Porto.

Football career 
Acúrsio gained 8 caps for Portugal and made his debut 20 May 1959 in Gothenburg against Sweden, in a 0-2 defeat. He played 4 matches in the 1960 European Nations' Cup qualification rounds.

References

External links 
 
 
 Acúrsio Carrelo Obituary (Portuguese)

1931 births
2010 deaths
Portuguese footballers
Association football goalkeepers
Clube Ferroviário de Maputo footballers
Primeira Liga players
FC Porto players
Portugal international footballers
Portuguese roller hockey players